Lior Keinan, since August 2017, has been Ambassador of Israel to South Africa, Lesotho, Eswatini and Mauritius.  In 2018, Madagascar was added to his portfolio.

Keinen earned a BA Degree in International Relations from the Hebrew University and an MBA from the Derby University, Tel Aviv Campus.

References

Ambassadors of Israel to Eswatini
Ambassadors of Israel to South Africa
Ambassadors of Israel to Lesotho
Ambassadors of Israel to Mauritius
Ambassadors of Israel to Madagascar
Hebrew University of Jerusalem Faculty of Social Sciences alumni
Year of birth missing (living people)
Living people